Clarence Park Festival is the longest running free music festival in Yorkshire, England. Known initially as Clarence Rocks Off it has been held annually at the bandstand in Clarence Park, Wakefield since 1991.

It is the flagship event for Wakefield Music Collective, a non-profit community group with open membership. Estimated attendance of the festival ranges between 2,000 and 8,000 depending on weather, and it is funded largely through grants, corporate sponsorship and other fundraising events throughout the year.

The 23rd Festival is taking place on the weekend of 26 and 27 July 2014. During the two days the Festival will showcase a host of bands as well as craft and food stalls, and a beer tent.

Artist selection process
Most artists are chosen by The Music Collective via a democratic application process which invites bands to apply via a post or an online portal. Selection takes place in April, followed by a press launch in May. The event is traditionally opened each day by a Wakefield-based act. There are no hard-and-fast rules on which genres are allowed to apply or play.

Alongside local acts, over the years the lineup has included, Dodgy, Eddie and The Hot Rods, Zodiac Mindwarp & The Love Reaction, John Otway and The Cribs' first band Wrinkle.

References

External links
 Wakefield Music Collective Official Website

Music festivals in West Yorkshire
Recurring events established in 1991
Free festivals
Music in Wakefield